Joseph Matthews may refer to:

 Joseph W. Matthews (1812–1862), American politician who served as Governor of Mississippi
 J. B. Matthews (1894–1966), Methodist churchman, chief investigator for the Martin Dies, Jr. House Committee on Un-American Activities
 Joseph Matthews (Medal of Honor) (1849–1912), U.S. Navy sailor and Medal of Honor recipient

See also
Joe Matthews (disambiguation)
Joseph Mathews (disambiguation)